Constance was a former loco depot and stop on the Wolgan Valley Railway. It was built as a turning triangle with a locomotive sheds, coaling and watering facilities and a crossing loop. The three Shay locomotives that worked the line were maintained here. Constance is located three miles from Newnes. However, it was closed in 1917 when the equipment was moved to the Oil Works site.

References

 Shays in the Valley by George Hicks

Disused regional railway stations in New South Wales
Railway stations closed in 1917
1917 establishments in Australia